The Job Lot  is a British sitcom. 
The series is set in a busy West Midlands Job Centre, and focuses on the relationships between the staff, and the job-seekers.

The series was commissioned following a successful pilot, written by Claire Downes, Stuart Lane and Ian Jarvis. It premiered on 29 April 2013 on ITV. It was later moved to ITV2 for its second series.

The show returned for a third and final series on ITV2 in October 2015.

It was confirmed by Russell Tovey in December 2016 that the show would not return for a fourth series.

Cast

Extras and Recurring cast 
Malkit Bharj (Series 1–2)
Amelia Parillon (Series 1–2)
Mark Bagnall (Series 1)
Nigel Boyle (Series 1–2)
Dylan Edwards (Series 2)
Debbie J. Nash (Series 2–3)

Guest stars

Emma Rigby (series 1) 
Sean Pertwee (series 1)
Susannah Fielding (series 1) 
Zahra Ahmadi (series 1)
Eileen Davies (series 1)
Ashley McGuire (series 1)
Keith Duffy (series 2)
Meera Syal (series 2)
Mark Benton (series 2)
Rosie Cavaliero (series 2)
John Thomson (series 3)
Will Mellor (series 3)
Sophie Stanton (series 3)
Maureen Lipman (series 3)
Christian Vit (series 3)

Locations
Despite being set in Birmingham the series was filmed mainly in East London, The building used as the exterior and interior of the job centre is the former LEB building situated at 255-279 Cambridge Heath Road, Bethnal Green (The name Brownall House can still be seen on the exterior). The back of the building and roof are part of Three Mills Film Studios in Bow.

Episodes

Series 1 (2013)

Series 2 (2014)
The Job Lot was renewed for a second series and was filmed in January and February 2014. The series again consists of six episodes and began transmission on ITV2 from 24 September 2014 at 10pm. The new episodes were repeated on ITV each Friday night at 10:40pm.

Series 3 (2015)
A third and final series was filmed in May and June 2015, and broadcast on ITV2 between 6 October and 10 November 2015 at 10:30pm (with the exception of the final episode which was broadcast at 10:00pm). The episodes were repeated on ITV on Monday nights (times varied). The series again consisted of six episodes.

DVD releases

References

External links

2010s British sitcoms
2013 British television series debuts
2015 British television series endings
Television shows set in the West Midlands (county)
ITV sitcoms
Television series by ITV Studios
Television series by Big Talk Productions
British workplace comedy television series
English-language television shows